Bleeding Shadows is  a  short story collection by American author Joe R. Lansdale. It was published by Subterranean Press on 28 November 2013. This volume contains 30 short stories that span Mr. Lansdale's extensive career.  This book is the largest collection of Mr. Lansdale's short stories available to date.

Contents
Introduction
"Torn Away"
"The Bleeding Shadow"
"A Visit with Friends"
"Christmas Monkeys"
"Christmas with the Dead"
"Quarry"
"Six Finger Jack"
"Mr. Bear"
"Old Man in the Motorized Chair"
"Apache Witch"
"Soldierin’"
"Death Before Bed"
"Apocalypse 195"
"A Strange Poem"
"Little Words"
"The Man"
"Dead Air"
"Dog in Winter"
"Hide and Horns"
"The Stars are Falling"
"Metal Men of Mars"
"Morning, Noon, and Night"
"Santa at the Café"
"What Happened to Me"
"Oink"
"Star Light, Eyes Bright"
"Dead Sister"
"Shooting Pool"
"The Folding Man (Based on the black car legend)"
"Dread Island"
"Story Notes"

Issues
This collection was released by Subterranean Press as both a limited edition with 250 signed numbered copies, with an exclusive wraparound dust jacket, housed in a custom slipcase, and as a fully cloth bound hardcover trade edition. As of November 1 the trade edition is already sold out from the publisher but will be available online.

External links
 Author's official website
 Subterranean Press website
 Cover artist's website

References

Short story collections by Joe R. Lansdale
Horror short story collections
2013 short story collections
Subterranean Press books